Maradana vidualis is a species of snout moth. It is found on Malta and Sicily and in  Tunisia.

The wingspan is 23–25 mm for females and 27–29 mm for males. Both sexes may be found in three different forms: a reddish/brown, light greyish-green and dark greyish-green form. This last colour form is the rarest and the reddish/brown form is the commonest. Adults are on wing from July to October in probably one generation per year.

References

External links
lepiforum.de

Moths described in 1911
Pyralini
Moths of Europe